Tully Church is an ancient church in County Dublin, Ireland.

Location

Tully Church lies in Laughanstown (variously spelled Lehaunestown, Lehaunstown); it is located in Dún Laoghaire-Rathdown, 500 m south-southeast of Laughanston Luas stop (Green Line).

The building

The original church structure dates to the 6th–9th centuries AD. One ancient name is Telach-na-nun ecspop (Tullow of the bishops) and it must have been an important venue if bishops met there. There is a legend that seven bishops started out from there to visit St Brigid at Kildare. Elsewhere these bishops are mentioned as the "Seven Bishops of Cabinteely" (Alice Curtayne, Saint Brigid of Ireland)

In 1179 the Church was granted to the Priory of The Holy Spirit.

The chancel, which is wider than the nave, was added in the late 12th or early 13th century by the Normans. The unusually larger chancel was added to the nave during the early 13th century and has a rounded arch and two rounded headed east windows. The nave dates to the 13th century.

The church was in use up to about 1615. It came under the authority of Christ Church Cathedral, Dublin who supplied clergy to keep it going. It was reported to be in good condition when inspected in 1615, but according to a report in 1630 had been badly damaged in recent storms. After that it was abandoned and fell into ruin.

Crosses

The cross by the roadside is set upon a plinth and is dedicated to James Crehan (Grehan) who apparently saved the Cross from being discarded when the level of the road was being adjusted in the late 1800s. The plinth replicates the soil removed leaving the Cross standing at its original height. There are a set of worn steps on one side of the plinth which allows one to climb up and view the Cross closely.

There is a second cross in the field opposite Tully Church and this can be accessed via a low wooden fence. This cross dates from the 12th century and is also reputed to be dedicated to St Brigit.

References

Religion in Dún Laoghaire–Rathdown
Archaeological sites in County Dublin
National Monuments in County Dublin